Grant Goldschmidt (born 16 April 1983) is a South African male beach volleyball player. He competed for South Africa at the 2012 Summer Olympics with teammate Freedom Chiya. They did not progress beyond the group stages.

He was born in Cape Town, South Africa.

References

1983 births
Living people
Sportspeople from Cape Town
South African beach volleyball players
Men's beach volleyball players
Beach volleyball players at the 2012 Summer Olympics
Olympic beach volleyball players of South Africa
African Games gold medalists for South Africa
African Games medalists in volleyball
Competitors at the 2011 All-Africa Games
Competitors at the 2019 African Games
Beach volleyball players at the 2022 Commonwealth Games